, also known as the Manx Language Society and formerly known as  Manx Gaelic Society, was founded in 1899 in the Isle of Man to promote the Manx language.

History

From 1897–1899 several meetings were held in Peel to discuss the Manx language. In the wake of these meetings, language classes began, as well as lectures given on Manx music and customs. The group's first president was A.W. Moore, later Speaker of the House of Keys.

After the visit by the Irish Folklore Commission, members of  continued to record the remaining native speakers despite technical and financial restraints: "We just – we wanted to record the old people but we didn't, we had neither the money nor the means of doing it". Eventually they were able to make these recordings, but often at significant financial expense to themselves; John Gell for example loaned them £8 to purchase the necessary equipment.

Recent years 
After a long period of relative inactivity, in the 1970s Doug Fargher helped to reinvigorate  by organising  ('Manx Language Nights') and publishing new learner material.

 has been involved in organising Cooish, an annual inter-Gaelic festival of language and culture on the Isle of Man every autumn since the 1990s. The festival aims to promote Gaelic and Manx identity and is "an opportunity to come together, enjoy the culture and celebrate one of the really unique ways of belonging to the Isle of Man". The festival includes musical performances, workshops, lectures, and language classes for children and adults.

A stamp celebrating the centenary of the Society was issued in the Isle of Man in 1999.

In more recent years,  has been heavily involved with the publication of Manx language and culture works, and the society works closely with Culture Vannin.

Selection of published works 

 Conversational Manx by John Gell
 First Lessons in Manx by Edmund Goodwin
 Manx is Fun: A New Course in Spoken Manx for the Beginner by Paul Rogers
  by Brian Stowell
  by Koizumi Yakumo (translated into Manx by R. W. K. Teare)
  by Ré Ó Laighléis (translated into Manx by R. W. K. Teare)
  by Christopher Lewin
  by John Gell
  by Lewis Crellin

See also

References

External links

Manx language
Cultural organisations based in the Isle of Man
Organizations established in 1899
1899 establishments in the Isle of Man
Celtic language advocacy organizations